A common year starting on Friday is any non-leap year (i.e. a year with 365 days) that begins on Friday, 1 January, and ends on Friday, 31 December. Its dominical letter hence is C. The most recent year of such kind was 2021 and the next one will be 2027 in the Gregorian calendar, or, likewise, 2011, 2022 and 2033 in the obsolete Julian calendar, see below for more. This common year is one of the three possible common years in which a century year can begin on, and occurs in century years that yield a remainder of 100 when divided by 400. The most recent such year was 1700 and the next one will be 2100.

Any common year that starts on Wednesday, Friday or Saturday has only one Friday the 13th: the only one in this common year occurs in August. Leap years starting on Thursday share this characteristic, but also have another one in February.

In this common year, February is rectangular where weeks start on Monday, Martin Luther King Jr. Day is on January 18, Valentine’s Day is on a Sunday, Presidents Day is on its earliest possible date, February 15, St. Patrick’s Day is on a Wednesday, Memorial Day is on its latest possible date, May 31, Juneteenth is on a Saturday, U.S. Independence Day and Halloween are on Sunday, Labor Day is on September 6, Thanksgiving is on November 25, and Christmas is on a Saturday.

Calendars 

This is the only year type where the nth "Doomsday" (this year Sunday) is not in ISO week n; it is in ISO week n-1.

Applicable years

Gregorian calendar 
In the (currently used) Gregorian calendar, alongside Sunday, Monday, Wednesday or Saturday, the fourteen types of year (seven common, seven leap) repeat in a 400-year cycle (20871 weeks). Forty-three common years per cycle or exactly 10.75% start on a Friday. The 28-year sub-cycle only spans across century years divisible by 400, e.g. 1600, 2000, and 2400.

400 year cycle:

century 1:  010, 021, 027, 038, 049, 055, 066, 077, 083, 094, 100
century 2:  106, 117, 123, 134, 145, 151, 162, 173, 179, 190
century 3:  202, 213, 219, 230, 241, 247, 258, 269, 275, 286, 297
century 4:  309, 315, 326, 337, 343, 354, 365, 371, 382, 393, 399

Julian calendar 
In the now-obsolete Julian calendar, the fourteen types of year (seven common, seven leap) repeat in a 28-year cycle (1461 weeks). This sequence occurs exactly once within a cycle, and every common letter thrice.

As the Julian calendar repeats after 28 years that means it will also repeat after 700 years, i.e. 25 cycles. The year's position in the cycle is given by the formula ((year + 8) mod 28) + 1). Years 4, 15 and 26 of the cycle are common years beginning on Friday. 2017 is year 10 of the cycle. Approximately 10.71% of all years are common years beginning on Friday.

References 

Gregorian calendar
Julian calendar
Friday